Prince Bagrat (died in 988) was a Georgian prince of the Bagrationi dynasty of Tao-Klarjeti.

Prince Bagrat was son of Sumbat II of Klarjeti and father of Sumbat III of Klarjeti and George. George was the father of Demetrius of Klarjeti.

He died forty days after his father, in 988.

References
Cyrille Toumanoff, Les dynasties de la Caucasie chrétienne de l'Antiquité jusqu'au XIXe siècle : Tables généalogiques et chronologiques, Rome, 1990, p. 132-133.
Marie-Félicité Brosset, Histoire de la Géorgie de l'Antiquité au XIXe siècle, Saint-Pétersbourg, 1849, p. 271-272.

988 deaths
Bagrationi dynasty of Klarjeti
Georgian princes
Year of birth unknown